Banksys N.V. (or Banksys SA) was a Belgian payment processor owned by Belgian banks.

It was formed in 1989 through the merge of ATM/POS networks of Bancontact and Mister cash. It also developed the Proton system, which was later spun-off into Proton World International.

The Belgian antitrust authority noted that Banksys was too dominant in the market for payment services. The Union of Self-Employed Entrepreneurs noted in 2003 that this issue has not been fixed Banksys was merged with Atos Worldline at the end of 2006, together with the Bank Card Company.

See also 

 Interpay
 EquensWorldline

References

External links 
  on the Internet Archive
 https://www.ecb.europa.eu/pub/pdf/other/ecbbluebookea200708en.pdf

Defunct companies of Belgium